Ardskeagh Church is a medieval church and a National Monument in County Cork, Ireland.

Location

History
Local history claims that it is named for Saint Sciath, a virgin saint who founded a convent here in AD 550. The present stone church was built in the 12th century and dedicated to Saint Michael; it appears in the Papal Taxation of 1302. By 1591 it was abandoned. The church is currently in state guardianship as a National Monument.

Church
The doorway is round-headed, with arch crudely repaired. There is plain, square moulding.

References

Religion in County Cork
Archaeological sites in County Cork
National Monuments in County Cork
Former churches in the Republic of Ireland